Megachile fulvimana is a species of bee in the family Megachilidae. It was described by Eduard Friedrich Eversmann in 1852.

References

Fulvimana
Insects described in 1852